Kaposvár is a district in the central-eastern part of Somogy County. Kaposvár is also the name of the town where the district and county seat is found. The district is located in the Southern Transdanubia Statistical Region.

Geography 
Kaposvár District borders with Fonyód District and Tab District to the north, Dombóvár District (Tolna County) and Hegyhát District (Baranya County) to the east, Szigetvár District (Baranya County) and Barcs District to the south, Nagyatád District and Marcali District to the west. The number of the inhabited places in Kaposvár District is 78.

Municipalities 
The district has 1 urban county, 3 towns and 74 villages.
(ordered by population, as of 1 January 2013)

The bolded municipalities are cities.

See also
List of cities and towns in Hungary

References

External links
 Postal codes of the Kaposvár District

Districts in Somogy County